The United Kingdom v Iran [1952] ICJ 2 (also known as the Anglo-Iranian Oil Co. case) was a public international law dispute between the UK and Iran. This case concerned the nationalization of Iran's oil which had been, in large part, controlled by the United Kingdom since the early 20th century.

Background 
The Anglo-Iranian Oil Company (formerly the Anglo-Persian Oil Company and currently BP) had been drilling for oil in Iran since 1913. In 1908, a British venture capitalist discovered oil in southern Iran. Throughout the early 20th century, the ruling Pahlavi government made various concessions with the British that gave the UK control over certain elements in the Iranian economy, the 1901 D'Arcy Concession being the earliest of these oil concessions. In 1933, another concession was made which extended the terms of the D'Arcy Concession by 32 years, from 1961 until 1993 and altered how revenue was allocated. The concession would later stoke discontent within Iran.

When Mohammad Mosaddeq became Iran's prime minister in 1951, his National Front party sought to nationalize Iran's oil industry and succeeded in doing so. This then led to the case of United Kingdom v. Iran being taken up by the International Court of Justice (ICJ).

Facts of the Case
The UK alleged that the Iranian oil nationalization act of 1951 was counter to a convention agreed upon by the Anglo-Persian Oil Company (now BP) and Iran in 1933.

On 26 May 1951, the UK took Iran to the ICJ, demanding that the 1933 agreement be upheld and that Iran pay damages and compensation for disrupting the UK-incorporated company's profits.

The ICJ quickly issued a temporary ruling, proposing to supervise the operations of the oil company by a board of 5 — two from each state and a fifth from a third — until the legal question had been resolved. The UK accepted, whereas Iran declined as a matter of principle, arguing that the ICJ had no jurisdiction over this case. The UK lodged a formal complaint to the Security Council, claiming that Iran jeopardized world peace by rejecting the temporary ruling out of hand, but the UK was unable to gain enough votes.

People involved

Sitting judges

Representatives

Judgment
On 22 July 1952, the ICJ decided that because Iran had conceded to ICJ jurisdiction only in cases involving treaties agreed upon after 1932 and as the only treaty cited by the UK after that date was between Iran and a foreign company (and not the UK itself), it had no jurisdiction in this matter (Iran's original contention).

Aftermath 

Despite the outcome of the case, the British government was determined to both reclaim control of Iran's oil fields and signal to other countries that nationalization efforts would lead to retaliation. Along with the United States government, it began an oil boycott against Iran as a means of cutting off petroleum profits and weakening the Iranian government. The value of the rial fell by 45%. Following this, the UK's intelligence service, MI6 requested assistance from the United States' newly-formed Central Intelligence Agency (CIA) to overthrow Mosaddeq. What followed was a series of disruptions and eventually Mosaddeq was overthrown in a coup in August 1953. Mohammad Reza Shah returned to Iran, solidified his authority backed by the U.S., and allowed a mix of foreign companies to control pricing and production in the oil sector for another 20 years, though with some increase in domestic revenue.

See also
 Anglo-Iranian Oil Dispute
 List of International Court of Justice cases

References

External links
International Court of Justice records of this case

International Court of Justice cases
1952 in case law
1952 in Iran
1952 in the United Kingdom
Iran–United Kingdom relations
BP litigation
1952 in international relations
Anglo-Persian Oil Company